Qutaibi or the Qutaibi Sheikhdom was a polity in the western Aden Protectorate.  It was a dependency of the Emirate of Dhala and is now part of the Republic of Yemen.  In 1964, during the Aden Emergency, Qutaibi tribesmen attacked British troops in the Radfan Hills area and became known as the "Red Wolves" for their ferocity in combat.

External links
"Tracking the 'Red Wolves of Radfan': from 1964 through 1967"
Map of Arabia (1905-1923) including the states of Aden Protectorate

History of Yemen
Former countries in the Middle East
Former monarchies of Asia